Hannibal Cobb is an American old-time radio detective drama. It was broadcast on ABC from January 9, 1950 until May 11, 1951.

Format
Hannibal Cobb was a detective who "took an intense personal interest in those for whom he worked." Described at the beginning of each episode as "... a dramatic story of human conflict vividly told ...", Cobb's adventures were reported from the client's viewpoint. 

In a radio version of counterprogramming, the program was unique in that it was broadcast in the daytime, when competing networks aired soap operas. In a January 6, 1950, article in The Cincinnati Enquirer, Lane Adams called the scheduling "almost a revolutionary break with hallowed radio precedent."

Hannibal Cobb was based on the Photocrime feature that ran in Look magazine.

Personnel
Santos Ortega portrayed Hannibal Cobb, and Les Griffith was the announcer. Producer/directors were Martin Andrews, William D. Hamilton, Roy LaPlante, and Charles Powers. Writers were Bernard Dougall, Louis Heyward, Ira Marion, and Lillian Schoen.

Television
In 1960, Filmmaster produced a series of 5-minute episodes of a Hannibal Cobb series that starred James Craig. The Video International Productions series was expected to have at least 189 episodes.

References

External links

Logs
Log of selected episodes of Hannibal Cobb from radioGOLDINdex

1950 radio programme debuts
1951 radio programme endings
1950s American radio programs
ABC radio programs
Cobb, Hannibal
Detective radio shows
American radio dramas